Phyllopsora rosei is a species of lichen belonging to the family Ramalinaceae.

It is native to Western Europe.

References

Lecanorales
Lichen species
Fungi of Europe
Lichens described in 1979
Taxa named by Peter Wilfred James
Taxa named by Brian John Coppins